Giovanni Nannelli (born 17 February 2000) is an Italian professional footballer who plays as a winger for  club Fermana on loan from Cesena.

Club career
Born in Empoli, Nannelli started his career in Fiorentina youth sector.

In 2019 he joined Lucchese, on Serie D, he made his senior debut this season and won the promotion to Serie C. Nannelli made his professional debut on 27 September 2020 against Pergolettese.

On 19 July 2021, he signed for Serie C club Cesena. 

On 29 January 2022, he moved on loan to Montevarchi. On 1 September 2022, Nannelli was loaned by Fermana.

References

External links
 
 

2000 births
Living people
People from Empoli
Footballers from Tuscany
Italian footballers
Association football wingers
Serie C players
Serie D players
ACF Fiorentina players
Lucchese 1905 players
Cesena F.C. players
Montevarchi Calcio Aquila 1902 players
Fermana F.C. players
Sportspeople from the Metropolitan City of Florence